Let Me Finish: Trump, the Kushners, Bannon, New Jersey, and the Power of In-Your-Face Politics is a 2019 autobiography by Chris Christie and Ellis Henican, looking back on Christie's political career, and, in particular, his endorsement of then-presidential candidate Donald Trump.

Reception
The review aggregator website Book Marks reported that 80% of critics "panned" the book, whilst the other 20% of the critics expressed "mixed" impressions, based on a sample of five reviews.

The Guardian Lloyd Green called the book a "self-serving, fascinating and informative read". Dwight Garner of The Independent wrote, "'Let Me Finish' is a superficial and ungainly book that tries to cover so many bases at once – it's a series of attacks and justifications, it's a master class in sucking up and kicking down, it's a potted memoir, it's a stab at political rehabilitation – that reading it is like watching an octopus try to play the bagpipes."

References

2019 non-fiction books
American autobiographies
Books about politics of the United States
Chris Christie
Political autobiographies
Hachette (publisher) books